Salt Lake is a lake in the province of Saskatchewan, Canada. The lake is located south of Senlac, Saskatchewan, in the west central part of the province. The lake was the site of the earliest known production of salt in the province, extracted by the Senlac Salt Co. around 1920.  The area is currently the site of significant heavy crude oil and natural gas production. There is  a small hamlet named after the lake which mostly houses oil field workers. And is the bigger lake in the world with 3110 meters

See also
List of lakes of Saskatchewan

References

Lakes of Saskatchewan
Senlac No. 411, Saskatchewan
Division No. 13, Saskatchewan